Shalom Catholic Community is recognized by the Catholic Church as the International Private Association of the Faithful for what the Church today calls "New Communities." Being a community of the Catholic Church, the Shalom Community serves in its work through a consecrated life of its members.

Shalom Catholic Community was founded in 1982 by Moyses Louro Azevedo Filho. At this time, the Church, especially after the Second Vatican Council, called young people to participate in the world, to be seeds of change, builders of peace, following the example set by Jesus Christ. Thus, united by the same ideal, young people came together and formed this Movement, which later expanded to Brazil. Shalom was the word with which they identified themselves, which means harmony, unity, blessing, joy and peace. His charism is the evangelization of the young by the young, with the goal of being the face of Christ in the Church and in society.

The Catholic Charismatic Renewal made a cafeteria a means of attracting young people to God. Today it is a large community in the country with over 10,000 members.

This community has hundreds of prayer groups scattered in its more than sixty missions distributed throughout the regions of Brazil and in various countries abroad (France, Canada, Italy, Israel, Hungary, Algeria, Madagascar, Switzerland, Uruguay, Chile, Guyana France, England, the United States, Paraguay, Bolivia, Ecuador, Tunisia, Peru, Portugal, Spain, Cape Verde, Mozambique, Panama, Argentina, the Philippines, Poland and Germany), promoting large and small evangelizing events to these groups and to catechetical and Christian formation courses and retreats, always at the request of local bishops.

Pontifical Recognition

The community received the Pontifical Recognition as the International Private Association of the Faithful in 2007 with a decree in force since February 22. New Communities are recent realities in the Church and are becoming increasingly numerous and very present in the Church's apostolate. For some time now, they have been gradually approved in the various dioceses, and gradually the approval at the pontifical level has begun.

In the period it received Recognition, the Shalom Community became the third of hundreds of new communities in the world to receive it, the first in Latin America. The decree was delivered to the founder Moysés Louro Azevedo Filho in Rome on March 13, 2007, and for the event there was a festive Triduum in Rome, to which pilgrims from various dioceses and nations in which the Community is present.

One of the most remarkable lines, of course, was Pope Benedict XVI when he said in the handing over of the Pontifical Recognition to the Shalom Community: "Always Be a Missionary Church!"

In May 2012, at the 30th Jubilee of the Community, it received its Definitive Recognition and Approval of its Statutes at the hands of Pope Benedict XVI through the Pontifical Council for the Laity.

According to Emmir Nogueira, co-founder of the Community, this recognition:

1. Authenticates the Vocation and its way of life as true;
2. Declares its need for the Church anywhere in the world;
3. Makes the Church responsible for the community.

In September 2017, on the occasion of the commemoration of the 35th anniversary of the founding of the Community, about 3,000 members were welcomed by Pope Francis at the Vatican in a private audience.

Communication
The Community offers 24 hours of AM Radio programming. Radio Shalom 690 AM from Fortaleza interacts with the internet public in Brazil and worldwide in its programming. It can be accessed from the Community Portal.

On July 24, 2019, Shalom FM 91.7, the community's first FM station, was inaugurated. It is an AM-FM migrant of the Boa Nova Radio 1410 of Pacajus in the Fortaleza Metropolitan Region.

See also
 Canção Nova Community
 Missionário Shalom

References

External links
 Shalom Portal
 Halleluya Festival
 Shalom Radio Network
 Shalom High School
 Ronaldo Pereira Virtual Museum

Catholic Church in Brazil
Fortaleza
20th-century Catholicism
21st-century Catholicism
1982 establishments in Brazil
Catholic spirituality
Pope Benedict XVI
Christian organizations established in 1982
Catholic organizations established in the 20th century